Articles (arranged alphabetically) related to Ivory Coast include:


0–9 
1999 Ivorian coup d'état

A 
 Abidjan
 Abokouamekro Game Reserve
 Abron
 AfricaPhonebook/Annulaires Afrique
 Anyi people
 Armed Forces of the Republic of Ivory Coast

B 
 Baoulé people
 Beki Bosse Matie Classified Forest
 Bondoukou
 Bouaké
 Boule (community)
 Dr. Boris

C 
 Charles Konan Banny
 Chocolate
 Cocoa
 Coffee
 Comazar
 Cotton
 Culture of Ivory Coast

D 
 Demographics of Ivory Coast
 Didier Drogba
 Districts of Ivory Coast
 Dr. Boris

E 
 Economy of Ivory Coast
 Education in Ivory Coast
 Etruscan Resources

F 
 Forces Nouvelles de Côte d'Ivoire (New Forces)
 Foreign relations of Ivory Coast

G 
 Geography of Ivory Coast

H 
 Heads of state of Ivory Coast
 Heads of government of Ivory Coast
 History of Ivory Coast

I 
 Islam in Ivory Coast
 Ivorian Liberation Movement
 Ivorian Revolutionary Party
 Ivoirité
 Ivory
 Ivory Coast
 Ivory Coast national football team

K

L 
 Laurent Gbagbo
 Lauric acid
 LGBT rights in Ivory Coast (Gay rights)
 List of cities in Ivory Coast
 List of national parks of Ivory Coast

M 
 Movement of Volunteer Teachers of Côte d'Ivoire (Mouvement des enseignants volontaires de Côte d'Ivoire - MEVCI)
 Education and Basic Training Minister Michel Amani N'Guessan
 Monrovia
 Music of Ivory Coast

N 
 National parks of Ivory Coast
 New Forces/Forces Nouvelles
 Nigeria

O 

 O'Plérou

P 
 Palm oil
 Palmitic acid
 Politics of Ivory Coast

R 
 Regions of Ivory Coast
 Religion in Ivory Coast
 Rubber
 Rubber tree
 Ivory Coast national rugby union team

S 
 Science and technology in Ivory Coast
 Sierra Leone
 Sitarail
 Souleymane Traoré of MEVCI
 Guillaume Soro, Prime Minister

T 
 Telecommunications in Ivory Coast
 Transport in Ivory Coast

W 
 West Africa

Y 
 Yamoussoukro

See also

Lists of country-related topics - similar lists for other countries

 
Ivory Coast